Kavalai Vendam is a 2016 Indian Tamil-language romantic comedy film written and directed by Deekay. The film stars Jiiva and Kajal Aggarwal, while Bobby Simha and Sunaina play supporting roles. The film, which is said to be an urban romance "about first love, second chances and relationships", features music composed by Leon James, cinematography by Abinandhan Ramanujam and editing by Suresh. Produced by Elred Kumar, Kavalai Vendam released on 24 November 2016 while its dubbed Telugu version Entha Varaku Ee Prema released on 7 April 2017 to mixed reviews and did average collections.

Cast 

 Jiiva as Aravind Bhaskar
 Kajal Aggarwal as Divya Priyadarshini
 Bobby Simha as Arjun
 Sunaina as Deepa
 Shruthi Ramakrishnan as Shilpa 
 RJ Balaji as 'Natty' Nataraj
 Bala Saravanan as Sathish
 Mayilsamy as Dr. Bhaskar ("Busy Kai" Bhaskar), Aravind's father
 Madhumitha as Shankari, Aravind's stepmother
 Manthra as Divya's mother
 Sriranjini as Arjun's mother
 Manobala as Pattai Babu
 Jyothi Lakshmi as Maya Aunty
 Rahul Thatha
 Yashika Aannand as Swimming Instructor (Cameo Appearance)
 Daniel Annie Pope as Black Thangappa (Cameo Appearance)
 VJ Adams as Delivery Boy (Cameo Appearance)
 Devipriya as Registrar's Wife (Cameo Appearance)

Production 
Following the success of their first collaboration Yaamirukka Bayamey (2014), producer Elred Kumar announced in June 2014 that he had signed on Deekay to make his second film for RS Infotainment. He revealed that the film would also be a "comedy" but a different genre from their earlier horror-comedy film In January 2015, Jiiva and Bobby Simha were reported to be playing the lead roles, with a press release in March 2015 confirming that Jiiva would play the lead role and that Simha would play an extended guest role. Titled Kavalai Vendam, Elred Kumar stated that he would retain music composer S. N. Prasad from their previous film, while bringing in cinematographer Mukesh and editor Ruben. Keerthy Suresh signed on to play the leading female role in March 2015, while Nikki Galrani was added to the cast thereafter for another lead role. A photo shoot featuring Jiiva and Keerthy Suresh was held in June 2015, with promotional stills released to indicate the start of the production phase. However, the film was later postponed and the first schedule was pushed back by six months. The change of dates meant that Keerthy Suresh could not accommodate the film into her schedule, and she was subsequently replaced by Kajal Aggarwal during August 2015. Pre-production works for the film was reported to be back underway in December 2015, with comedians RJ Balaji, Bala Saravanan and Mayilswamy added to the cast. The delays also meant that Nikki Galrani quit the project after committing to work on other films during the period.

The film began its schedule in Coonoor during mid-January 2016, with further changes made to the crew of the film. A press release revealed that Leon James had been brought in to compose the film's soundtrack, while Abinandhan Ramanujam was signed as the cinematographer. Actresses Sunaina and Shruthi Ramakrishnan also joined the team during the first schedule, with Sunaina revealing that she would portray a character who is in love with Jiiva's character. The team shot for a month in Coonoor and Kotagiri, often working for up to fifteen hours a day and by the end of the schedule, Deekay revealed that the film was "sixty percent" complete. The second schedule of the film, initially scheduled for March, was delayed as a result of the 2016 Tamil Nadu elections and as a result, the team restarted work in June 2016 with a song sequence shot in Kotagiri. Further scenes including the climax was shot in Ooty during early July 2016, before the team moved to Chennai to film more scenes. Another song featuring Jiiva and Kajal Aggarwal was shot in Mahabalipuram and on locations on the East Coast Road during the same month, with the makers revealing that the film was "eighty percent" complete.

Release 
In August 2016, Elred Kumar announced that the film would release on 7 October 2016 coinciding with the Ayudha Puja holidays in India, but the team consequently chose to postpone the project to avoid competition with other films. During the period, distributor Abinesh Elangovan also purchased the Indian theatrical rights of the film to release through his studio, Abi & Abi Pictures. D. Venkatesh of DV Cine Creations bought the Telugu dubbing rights of the film and subsequently prepared the Telugu version titled Entha Varaku Ee Prema. A first look poster was released through Twitter in early August, while a teaser trailer was released by actor Dhanush two weeks later. Subsequently, in mid-November, Elred Kumar announced a new release date of 24 November and the film began promotional work, with a second teaser trailer being released.

Soundtrack 

The film's score and soundtrack is composed by Leon James, with the four songs written by Ko. Sesha. Two singles released prior to the release of the full album; "Un Kadhal Irundhal Pothum" by Armaan Malik and Shashaa Tirupati was released on 17 August 2016, while "En Pulse Yethitu Poriye" featuring vocals from Inno Genga, Andrea Jeremiah, Dinesh Kanagaratnam and Leon James was released on 2 September 2016. The full album released on 17 October 2016, with a further song titled "Nee Tholaindhaayo" by Sid Sriram and a reprise of "Un Kadhal Irundhal Podhum" by Vandana Srinivasan unveiled. Upon release, the album won largely positive reviews from critics. Behindwoods.com called it a "beautiful album from Leon James which has compositions of high musical value", while Karthik Srinivasan of Milliblog.com stated "Leon is proving himself to be a consistent and nifty composer". The dubbed Telugu version of the audio was released in late October 2016 with a music launch event.

References

External links 
 

2016 films
Indian romantic comedy films
Films shot in Ooty
2010s Tamil-language films
2016 romantic comedy films